The Barryville–Shohola Bridge is the fifth generation of bridges constructed over the Delaware River at the communities of Shohola Township, Pennsylvania and Barryville, New York. The bridge serves both communities, with two major state legislative highways, Pennsylvania Traffic Route 434 and New York State Touring Route 55 (along with the co-designation of Sullivan County Route 11). It is maintained by the NY–PA Joint Interstate Bridge Commission, which is jointly owned by the states of New York and Pennsylvania.

The area of the bridge itself dates as a ford for Native Americans, mostly the Lenni Lenapi, traveling between from the Wyoming valley and Delaware Valley and present-day Connecticut in the early 18th century; archaeologists date human habitation and use of the area to 10,900 BCE. The river at Shohola, which means "place of peace," widens perceptibly above the falls, allowing for a natural, shallow crossing.  By the early 19th century, a ferry facilitated crossing the river.  Due to the construction of the nearby Delaware and Hudson Canal in 1827, commerce and business boomed in the area.  In 1856, a bridge company, under the leadership of Chauncey Thomas, constructed a span between the two communities, but it was poorly designed and collapsed during a windstorm in 1859.  Thomas then constructed a suspension bridge, but its cables snapped in 1865.

In 1866, the bridge was reconstructed as a two-lane, single span wooden suspension structure and remained in use for over seventy years. Ownership changed several times, eventually ending with the bridge in the control of the Joint Delaware River Bridge Commission. The bridge was replaced again in 1941 for $174,300 (1941 USD ($ in )), with a steel truss span. This structure lasted another sixty-five years, finally deteriorating until the demolition of the structure in 2007, upon completion of the new bridge.

Early history 
Originally the site of a ford, the area was used by the Lenni Lenape and Delawares on their way to and from the shores of present-day Long Island Sound. The original trail followed the Shohola Creek, where it enters the Delaware, to a location along the eastern bank of the river near Shohola. By the end of the 18th century, European settlers operated a ferry near the current span, crossing between Shohola to a settlement on the opposite bank, that later became Barryville.  The 1827 construction of the Delaware and Hudson Canal and the subsequent construction of the  Erie Railroad in 1849) accentuated the need for a bridge to accommodate the increase in population and business in the area.

First two spans (1856–1865) 

As the need for a bridge from Shohola to Barryville grew, the Shohola and Barryville Bridge Company, formed in 1854, planned the construction of the first bridge. The company's president, Chauncey Thomas, attempted to hire John Augustus Robeling, a bridge expert, who was building a bridge in the Niagara region of New York and Canada (which came to be known as the Niagara Falls Suspension Bridge), which was to be built as an  two-deck span over the Niagara River, and who had completed successful spans over the rivers in Pittsburgh, Pennsylvania.

Roebling declined the offer but gave Thomas verbal and written instructions on its construction during a visit to the Niagara construction site. Thomas returned to Shohola and supervised the construction himself, using some inexperienced local men he hired. A respected historian, John Willard Johnston, who knew Chauncey Thomas personally, visited the bridge and told the owner at the time that Thomas was very inexperienced in bridge construction. The rapid growth of the area due to the construction of the Canal and the Erie Railroad meant the bridge was immediately in heavy use.

Thomas' wire-rope span bridge was damaged by a severe wind storm on July 2, 1859, exactly three years after it opened. The storm, which destroyed almost the entire bridge, was not a singular experience.  Wind storms often build in the river valley, bring strong winds down the valley against weaker pressure systems to the south and east. A man and a woman who were crossing the bridge were injured when it collapsed. The local ferry, which had been out of commission for only three years, was still in good condition and re-fitted for use in 1859, to operate along the remaining abutments and piers that survived the storm.

The bridge was rebuilt quickly, again under the supervision of Thomas, who was still company president. Thomas was able to complete the bridge, and ended up raising a total cost for construction of $4,000 (1859 USD ($ in ))), an expedient necessitated by the lack of funds in the company treasury. Shortly after the new construction, Thomas was replaced by James E. Gardner as company president; Gardner died soon after his election, and was succeeded by Napoleon B. Johnson. Johnson ran the bridge company well, and remained as president of the corporation for several years. However, on January 1, 1865, the cables snapped under the weight of mules and wagons, and the entire bridge fell into the river, injuring the wagoners, and drowning three of the mules. Once again, ferries filled the needs that were previously fulfilled by the suspension bridge.

Third span (1866–1939) 
With the second span of the Barryville–Shohola Suspension Bridge having fallen into the Delaware River in 1865, the bridge company that maintained the span fell into a financial depression. After the destruction of the second span, company president Johnson had borrowed money for the company itself that he was unable to pay back. In 1865, company had no funds to repair the partially collapsed bridge, nor credit to borrow any. The former president Chauncey Thomas bought the bankrupt company in a sheriff's sale for $1,979 (1865 USD ($ in )). Thomas was now the sole owner of the wrecked bridge.

To repair the bridge, Thomas would need to receive and pay more money, and he did. Along with the complete repair in 1866, another pier was added to increase the stability of the weak structure.
The 1866 construction was considerably stronger, compared to the two previous spans, due to major renovations. The old cables that snapped had been replaced by newer, stronger ones. Thomas also gave the span a new deck floor, a bridge railing and new stringers. The bridge was much better cared for this time around, as it also survived a local flood in 1903 and an icestorm in the early months of spring 1904.

Chauncey Thomas died at his home in Shohola on October 5, 1882, sixteen years after the new bridge was repaired. Since Thomas had never written a will, estate and property were divided between his children and his grandchildren. A friend to the Thomas family, Stephen St. John Gardiner, became the administrator of the estate. With the job, Gardiner was able to buy the bridge. He became controller and majority of the bridge's stock.

By the start of the 20th century, regional economic conditions changed. The Delaware and Hudson Canal Company had closed, as had local logging and mining companies. Shohola and Barryville had become summer resorts and the now-aging antique bridge had become a local picturesque attraction for out-of-town visitors. On June 26, 1920, the suspension bridge was bought by the Joint Bridge Commission of Pennsylvania and New York for $22,600.00 (1923 USD ($ in )). Half of the $22,600.00 was to be paid for by the state of New York, the other by Pennsylvania. The toll that was used on the span was removed. The single-lane, aging structure, now owned by the commission, served the local residents well into the new century. However, the old age of the bridge showed on the bridge itself. In 1939, the commission closed off the structurally deficient bridge to traffic, and began looking into ways to build a new bridge in the area. In 1940, the bridge was reopened for light, local car traffic. but demolished in 1941, when the fourth and then-newest span of the bridge was opened.

Fourth span (1941–2007) 
 
The Joint Bridge Commission of Pennsylvania and New York hired the Whittaker and Diehl Company in early of 1941 to construct a $174,300 (1941 USD ($ in )) steel, two-lane truss bridge to replace the aging structure.

With the construction, there was a tunnel built on the Pennsylvania side for the Erie Railroad line that went nearby. This helped end the constant traffic jams and accidents caused by the railroad crossing. This bridge was slightly downriver from the former spans. It had an average daily traffic rate of 1,635 people in 2004. Replacing the fourth bridge, according to the United States Department of Transportation, would cost about $5,628,000 (2006 USD$,  in )).

The fourth span went into commission just days before Attack on Pearl Harbor in December 1941. After the United States entered World War II, construction and reconstruction in the area had ended, while the nation transformed into a war economy. and the residents had received their new bridge span just in time. The bridge structure lasted through World War II and several river floods. The bridge lasted for several decades, until the start of the 21st century, when plans were made to replace the deteriorating truss structure.

Fifth span (2007–present) 

With the deterioration of the fourth span, the bridge commission and the Pennsylvania Department of Transportation started construction on a $9.38 million (2007 USD ($ in )) concrete bridge with steel beams connecting Traffic Route 434 on the Pennsylvania side (assigned in 1967) and Touring Route 55/Sullivan County Route 11 (assigned in 1930). The construction began in February 2004, and since there was no place to perform a groundbreaking ceremony, the construction company hired, Fahs Construction Group of Binghamton, New York performed a "bridge-breaking" ceremony on March 25, 2004, taking sledgehammers to the bridge. The bridge was expected to have resemble the Roebling Aqueduct, which lay to the north in Minisink Ford, New York. The bridge was proposed to be  with twin  travel lanes and an  shoulder. It was to also have three balconies facing upstream of the Delaware River, to offer travelers scenic views.

A number of difficulties and unforeseen circumstances delayed construction.  First, the Pennsylvania Historical and Museum Commission had been conducting archaeological digs in the area since 1996, and had found a variety of artifacts dating from the Clovis period, with radio carbon age dating around 10,900 BCE, making them one of the oldest sites in the eastern United States; the sites also includes evidence of food, making it one of the rarer paleolithic finds. The next circumstance was that there was worry that the construction of the bridge might affect the river ecosystem, particularly some of the river water organisms. After some regulations were added and problems were sorted out, the construction continued. The third issue was that the bridge may run into problems with boaters, and therefore, the bridge was given the same regulations as bridges upstream. Finally, the Delaware's low water level meant that barges could not be used in the construction. When Hurricane Ivan struck in 2004, the water level rose, allowing for the use of the barges, but destroying several construction items used for the bridge in the process.

The bridge, which had an estimated completion in the autumn of 2006 according to the Pennsylvania Department of Transportation, was opened on-time on October 26, 2006. This closed the old 1940 structure from use, coned off from Route 434 and Route 55. Once abutment work was finished, the now Fahs-Rolson Construction Company began demolishing the old structure. However, unfinished paving work was completed in October 2007. The total cost for the replacement project came out in 2009 at $11.62 million (2007 USD ($ in )).

The bridge had temporary fencing and new walkways along a six-lane span, with locals saying that the stone structure fitting into the looks of the scenic Delaware River Valley. The old bridge was demolished after construction completed.

See also 

 List of crossings of the Delaware River
 New York–Pennsylvania Joint Interstate Bridge Commission

References

External links 
Bridgemeister's page on the 1855 bridge

Bridges over the Delaware River
Bridges in Sullivan County, New York
Bridges in Pike County, Pennsylvania
Road bridges in New York (state)
Road bridges in Pennsylvania
Former toll bridges in New York (state)
Former toll bridges in Pennsylvania
Concrete bridges in the United States
New York–Pennsylvania Joint Interstate Bridge Commission